The House of 72 Tenants (七十二家房客) is a 1973 Hong Kong film directed by Chor Yuen. It is a remake of a 1963 Chinese film of the same name. It was the top box office film of 1973 in Hong Kong, surpassing Bruce Lee's Enter the Dragon.

Plot 
The 72 inhabitants of a dilapidated tenement live under the thumb of a heartless landlady and her sleazy husband. The arrival of a defiant new tenant, the cobbler Fat Chai, sets their downfall in motion. The residents pool their resources to prevent evictions, deflect targeted harassment by a corrupt policeman, rescue the landlords' adopted daughter from a life of torment, and ultimately prevent their home from being sold and turned into a brothel.

Cast
 Yueh Hua - Fat Chai
 Ouyang Sha-fei
 Chan Shen - Brother Shum
 Adam Cheng
 Cheng Hong-Yip
 Cheng Kang
 Chen Kuan Tai - Police Constable (cameo)
 Ching Miao
 Chor Yuen - thief in market (cameo)
 Chung Hwa
 Do Ping
 Got Dik Wa
 Lily Ho
 Ivan Ho
 Hu Ching
 Ricky Hui
 Ku Feng
 Lau Tan
 Law Lan
 Cheng Lee - Ah Heung (credited as Ching Li)
 Danny Lee
 Lee Sau Kei
 Leung Tin
 Liu Hui-Ling
 Nan Hong
 Peng Peng
 Sai Gwa-pau
 Shih Szu
 Lydia Shum - Shanghai Po
 Tien Ching - Chow Bing Ken
 Betty Pei Ti
 Wang Chung (actor)
 Wong Ching-Ho
 Wong Kwong Yue
 Karen Yeh - Mrs. Han
 Yeung Chak Lam

Special notes
The House of 72 Tenants can be considered to have started a new era for Hong Kong film industry. Before the release of this movie, most high-class movies filmed in the then British colony were shot and recorded in Mandarin, while the less respected ones would be shot and recorded in Cantonese. However, since the debut of the movie, which was filmed in Cantonese, and the popularity it achieved, subsequent major Hong Kong films switched their language from Mandarin to Cantonese.

Parodies
Parodies of this movie are found in many of Hong Kong's films and Television shows.

In movies:
 He Ain't Heavy, He's My Father: Chor Yuen, the director for The House of 72 Tenants is part of the cast.
 Kung Fu Hustle

In TV shows:
 Enjoy Yourself Tonight: Where Lydia Shum continues to play the role of 'Shanhai-por' from this movie.

See also
 72 Tenants of Prosperity

References

External links
 
 Review at LoveHKfilm.com
 Review at BRNS
 The House of 72 Tenants at hkmdb.com

1973 films
Shaw Brothers Studio films
1973 comedy-drama films
Cantonese-language films
Remakes of Chinese films
Films directed by Chor Yuen
1973 comedy films
1973 drama films
Hong Kong comedy-drama films
1970s Hong Kong films